Allkem Limited, known as Orocobre Limited until 30 November 2021, is a mineral resource company based in Brisbane, Australia. The company's present focus is on lithium and borax mining operations within Argentina. Since 2007 Orocobre Ltd. is registered at the Australian Securities Exchange ASX (symbol: AKE) and as of 2010 listed on the (Toronto Stock Exchange) TSX (symbol: ORL). The company is included in the S&P/ASX 300 Index.

Projects

Salar de Olaroz 
The Salar de Olaroz is a salt lake in the province of Jujuy in northwestern Argentina, close to the Chilean border. The project consists of 63,000 hectares of tenements over a salar known to contain high values of lithium and potash in brine. In October 2012, Orocobre and Toyota Tsusho Corporation (TTC) executed a definitive joint venture agreement to develop the Olaroz Lithium Project. Earlier in the year, in June 2012, Orocobre had entered into an agreement with Jujuy Energia y Mineria Sociedad del Estado (JEMSE), a mining investment company owned by the provincial Government of Jujuy, whereby JEMSE will hold an equity interest in the Olaroz project and in return provide assistance during its development.

Results from a definitive feasibility study (DFS) released May 3, 2011 suggest that the Olaroz project has a large resource base of 6.5 million tonnes of lithium carbonate equivalent with a project mine life estimated at 40 years.  The design capacity of the Olaroz operation has been increased to 17,500 tonnes per annum (tpa) of battery grade lithium carbonate, from 16,400 tpa originally provided for in the DFS. Expected potash recovery has also been increased to approximately 20,000 tpa compared to 10,000 tpa. Potash operations are not currently included in the immediate project plans or economics at this time, but are said to be considered in future development phases.

Borax Argentina 
Orocobre acquired Borax Argentina S.A. (Borax Argentina), a long established Argentine boron (or borate) minerals and refined chemicals producer, in August 2012 from Rio Tinto PLC. Borax Argentina owns one of only a few important borate deposits globally that are in production.

Borax Argentina operate three open pit mines in Tincalayu, Sijes, and Porvenir located within the Jujuy and Salta Province in Northern Argentina. Borate mining operations have been undertaken in the area for over 50 years with a recent announcement by Ororocbre suggesting a positive outlook for future mining operation with the presence of long-life high quality ore reserves.

Currently, Borax Argentina's operations produce a variety of boron chemical products, including boric acid, borax decahydrate, borax pentahydrate, anhydrous borax and boroglas from concentrates and ulexite minerals carted from the mines and concentrators. In addition, the mine and concentrator at Sijes produce mineral concentrates for direct sale.

On 1 July 2013 Orocobre announced the relocation of the borax chemical plant from its location in Campo Quijano (close to the city of Salta) to the Tincalayu mine site. The relocation of the borax chemical plant is said to have significant financial benefits for the company through a reduction of both operating and logistics cost. The relocation project is said to be completed by the end of June 2014 within a budget cost of US$3.7m.

Cauchari 

The Salar de Cauchari lithium-potash resource, owned by South American salar Minerals Pty Ltd, has over 30,000 ha in Jujuy province immediately south of the Olaroz Project. The Cauchari project has similar geo-chemical characteristics to the Olaroz resource and provides a nearby additional brine source for future expansions of the planned Olaroz production facility at relatively low incremental capital cost.

Salinas Grandes 

In early 2010, Orocobre announced the discovery by South American Salars of what was believed to be very attractive lithium and potassium sampling results at Salinas Grandes. Sampling indicated highly concentrated levels of lithium and potassium over an area of the nucleus covering approximately 60 square kilometres. Initial resource estimates undertaken by an independent hydrogeological assessment for Salinas Grandes were announced by Orocobre March 2012. These findings estimated an inferred resource equivalent to 239,200 tonnes of lithium carbonate and 1.03 million tonnes of potash.

Guayatoyoc 

Guayatoyoc is a high grade Potassium discovery in the Puna Region of Northwest Argentina. The high potassium grades combined in close proximity to the Olaroz operation account for potential factors in Orocobre's economic interest in the Guayatoyoc Project.

Corporate social responsibility 

Orocobre engages in a number of corporate social responsibility ventures with the local communities, business partners and employees across its operations in Argentina. Key areas of focus have been in the assistance and development of education, health and worker skill/business advancement. Educational assistance has been provided through the implementation of various technology, sporting and academic activities aimed at the youth of Argentine's Puna region. Orocobre has also been activate in preventative health programs for the local communities through joint assistance with the Beñen Hospital in Susques (Jujuy Province) and the Hospital of San Antonio de los Cobres in Salta Province. Local towns and villages have been provided access to paediatric, ophthalmology, odontology, audiology, and nutrition services that were previously not available. Increased employment opportunities and skill-set training were also active parts of Orocobre's corporate social responsibilities. The positive socioeconomic effects from Orocobre's projects are also being embraced by non-affiliated local businesses such as food stores, accommodation and transport providers.

References 

Orocobre company presentation
Orocobre ASX announcement
Orocobre prospectus 2007
Olaroz resource estimate
Olaroz scoping study

External links
 Official Orocobre Website
 Official Sales De Jujuy Website
 Official Borax Argentina Website

Companies listed on the Toronto Stock Exchange
Mining companies of Australia
Companies listed on the Australian Securities Exchange
Companies based in Brisbane